Tafea Football Club is a soccer team from Port Vila in Vanuatu.

Tafea FC won the first 15 championships since the start of the Premia Divisen of Port Vila Football League (first in the 16th season Amicale FC could beat Tafea's championship subscription). With 15 consecutive national championship titles Tafea FC holds the world record of championships in a row. The team reached the final of 2001 Oceania Club Championship Tournament where it lost out to Australia's Wollongong Wolves.

Achievements
Vanuatu National Soccer League: 4
 2005, 2009, 2013, 2014

Port Vila Football League: 1
 1994, 1995, 1996, 1997, 1998, 1999, 2000, 2001, 2002, 2003, 2004, 2005, 2006, 2007, 2008–09, 2018-19 
6

Performance in OFC competitions
OFC Champions League: 9 appearances
Best: 2nd place in 2001
1987: 6th place
1999: 5th place
2001: 2nd place
2005: 3rd place
2006: 5th place
2007–08: 4th place
2009–10: 5th place
2013–14: 9th place
2014–15: 8th place

Current squad
Squad for 2019-20 Port Vila Premier League

Staff

Former Coaches

  Marcel Mao

References

Football clubs in Vanuatu
Port Vila